Shīʿa Islam, otherwise known as Shīʿism or as Shīʿite or Shīʿī Islam, is the second-largest branch of Islam. It holds that the Islamic prophet Muhammad designated ʿAlī ibn Abī Ṭālib as his successor (khalīfa) and the Imam (spiritual and political leader) after him, most notably at the event of Ghadir Khumm, but was prevented from succeeding Muhammad as the leader of the Muslims as a result of the choice made by some of Muhammad's other companions (ṣaḥāba) at Saqifah. This view primarily contrasts with that of Sunnī Islam, whose adherents believe that Muhammad did not appoint a successor before his death and consider Abū Bakr, who was appointed caliph by a group of senior Muslims at Saqifah, to be the first rightful (rāshidūn) caliph after Muhammad. Adherents of Shīʿa Islam are called Shīʿa Muslims, Shīʿites, or simply Shīʿa, Shia, or Shīʿīs.

Shīʿa Islam is based on a ḥadīth report concerning Muhammad's pronouncement at Ghadir Khumm. Shīʿa Muslims believe that ʿAlī ibn Abī Ṭālib, Muhammad's cousin and son-in-law, should have been the designated successor to Muhammad as Islam's spiritual and political leader. This belief later developed into the concept of Imamah, the idea that certain descendants of Muhammad, the Ahl al-Bayt, are rightful rulers or Imams, whom Shīʿa Muslims believe possess special spiritual and political authority over the Muslim community. Although there are many Shīʿa subsects, modern Shīʿa Islam has been divided into two main groupings: Twelvers and Ismāʿīlīs, with Twelver Shīʿas being the largest and most influential group among Shīʿa Muslims.

Shīʿa Islam is the second largest branch of Islam, followed by 10–15% of all Muslims. Twelver Shīʿīsm is the largest branch of Shīʿa Islam, comprising about 85% of all Shīʿa Muslims.

Terminology
Collectively, adherents of Shīʿa Islam are called the Shīʿa, which is short for Shīʿatu ʿAlī meaning "followers of Ali", "faction of Ali", or "partisans of Ali"; Shīʿī denotes both the singular noun and the adjective form, while Shīʿiyyūn refers to the plural noun. Shīʿa or Shia and Shīʿism/Shīʿite or Shiism/Shiite are the forms used in English and other European languages for adherents, mosques, traditions, and things associated with the Shīʿa branch of Islam.

The term was first used during Muhammad's lifetime. At present, the word refers to the Muslims who believe that the leadership of the Muslim community after Muhammad belongs to ʿAlī ibn Abī Ṭālib, Muhammad's cousin and son-in-law, and his successors. Nawbakhti states that the term Shīʿa refers to a group of Muslims who at the time of Muhammad and after him regarded ʿAlī as the Imam and caliph. Al-Shahrastani expresses that the term Shīʿa refers to those who believe that ʿAlī is designated as the heir, Imam, and caliph by Muhammad and that ʿAlī's authority is maintained through his descendants. For the adherents of Shīʿa Islam, this conviction is implicit in the Quran and the history of Islam. Shīʿa Muslim scholars emphasize that the notion of authority is linked to the family of the Abrahamic prophets as the Quranic verses  and  show: "Indeed, God chose Adam and Noah and the family of Abraham and the family of 'Imran over the worlds – (33) Descendants, some of them from others. And God is Hearing and Knowing. (34)"

Beliefs and practices

Theology

Shīʿa Islam is the second largest branch of Islam, followed by 10–15% of all Muslims, considered to be vast and inclusive of many different denominations and subgroups. Shīʿa Islam embodies a completely independent system of religious interpretation and political authority in the Muslim world. The original Shīʿa identity referred to the followers of Imam ʿAlī, and Shīʿa theology was formulated after the hijra (8th century CE). The first Shīʿa governments and societies were established by the end of the 9th century CE. The 10th century CE has been referred to by the scholar of Islamic studies Louis Massignon as "the Shiite Ismaili century in the history of Islam".

Profession of faith (Shahada)

The Shīʿa version of the Shahada, the Islamic profession of faith, differs from that of the Sunnīs. The Sunnī version of the Shahada states "There is no god except God, Muhammad is the messenger of God", but to this declaration of faith Shīʿa Muslims append the phrase Ali-un-Waliullah (: "ʿAlī is the Wali (custodian) of God"). The basis for the Shīʿa belief in ʿAlī ibn Abī Ṭālib as the Wali of God is derived from the Quranic verse , the "Verse of Wilayah".

This additional phrase to the declaration of faith embodies the Shīʿa emphasis on the inheritance of authority through Muhammad's family and lineage. The three clauses of the Shīʿa version of the Shahada thus address the fundamental Islamic beliefs of Tawḥīd (unity and oneness of God), Nubuwwah (the prophethood of Muhammad), and Imamah (the Imamate, leadership of the faith).

Infallibility (Ismah)

Ismah is the concept of infallibility or "divinely bestowed freedom from error and sin" in Islam. Muslims believe that Muhammad, along with other prophets and messengers in Islam, possessed ismah. Twelver and Ismāʿīlī Shīʿa Muslims also attribute the quality to Imams as well as to Fāṭimah, daughter of Muhammad, in contrast to the Zaydī Shīʿas, who don't attribute ismah to the Imams. Though initially beginning as a political movement, infallibility and sinlessness of the Imams later evolved as a distinct belief of (non-Zaydī) Shīʿīsm.

According to Shīʿa Muslim theologians, infallibility is considered a rational, necessary precondition for spiritual and religious guidance. They argue that since God has commanded absolute obedience from these figures, they must only order that which is right. The state of infallibility is based on the Shīʿa interpretation of the Verse of Purification. Thus, they are the most pure ones, the only immaculate ones preserved from, and immune to, all uncleanness. It doesn't mean that supernatural powers prevent them from committing a sin, but due to the fact that they have absolute belief in God, they refrain from doing anything that is a sin.

They also have a complete knowledge of God's will. They are in possession of all knowledge brought by the angels to the prophets (nabī) and the messengers (rāsūl). Their knowledge encompasses the totality of all times. Thus, they are believed to act without fault in religious matters. Shīʿa Muslims regard ʿAlī ibn Abī Ṭālib as the successor of Muhammad not only ruling over the entire Muslim community in justice, but also interpreting the Islamic faith, practices, and its esoteric meaning. Hence he was regarded as being free from error and sin (infallible), and appointed by God by divine decree (nass) to be the first Imam. ʿAlī is regarded as a "perfect man" (al-insan al-kamil) similar to Muhammad, according to the Shīʿa viewpoint.

Occultation (Ghaybah)

The Occultation is an eschatological belief held in various denominations of Shīʿa Islam concerning a messianic figure, the hidden and last Imam known as "the Mahdi", that one day shall return on Earth and fill the world with justice. According to the doctrine of Twelver Shīʿīsm, the main goal of Imam Mahdi will be to establish an Islamic state and to apply Islamic laws that were revealed to Muhammad. The Quran doesn't contain verses on the Imamate, which is the basic doctrine of Shīʿa Islam. Some Shīʿa subsects, such as the Zaydī Shīʿas and Nizārī Ismāʿīlīs, don't believe in the idea of the Occultation. The groups which do believe in it differ as to which lineage of the Imamate is valid, and therefore which individual has gone into Occultation. They believe there are many signs that will indicate the time of his return.

Twelver Shīʿa Muslims believe that the prophesied Mahdi and twelfth Imam, Hujjat Allah al-Mahdi, is already on Earth in Occultation, and will return at the end of time. Ṭayyibi Ismāʿīlīs and Fatimid/Bohra/Dawoodi Bohra believe the same but for their 21st Ṭayyib, At-Tayyib Abi l-Qasim, and also believe that a Da'i al-Mutlaq ("Unrestricted Missionary") maintains contact with him. Sunnī Muslims believe that the future Mahdi has not yet arrived on Earth.

Ḥadīth tradition
Shīʿa Muslims believe that the status of ʿAlī is supported by numerous ḥadīth, including the Hadith of the pond of Khumm, Hadith of the two weighty things, Hadith of the pen and paper, Hadith of the invitation of the close families, and Hadith of the Twelve Successors. In particular, the Hadith of the Cloak is often quoted to illustrate Muhammad's feeling towards ʿAlī and his family by both Sunnī and Shīʿa scholars. Shīʿa Muslims prefer to study and read the ḥadīth attributed to the Ahl al-Bayt and close associates, and most have their own separate ḥadīth canon.

Holy Relics (Tabarruk)
It is believed that the armaments and sacred items of all of the prophets, including Muhammad, were handed down in succession to the Imams of the Ahl al-Bayt. Jaʿfar al-Ṣādiq, the 6th Shīʿīte Imam, in Kitab al-Kafi mentions that "with me are the arms of the Messenger of Allah. It is not disputable."

Further, he claims that with him is the sword of the Messenger of God, his coat of arms, his Lamam (pennon) and his helmet. In addition, he mentions that with him is the flag of the Messenger of God, the victorious. With him is the Staff of Moses, the ring of Solomon, son of David, and the tray on which Moses used to offer his offerings. With him is the name that whenever the Messenger of God would place it between the Muslims and pagans no arrow from the pagans would reach the Muslims. With him is the similar object that angels brought.

Al-Ṣādiq also narrated that the passing down of armaments is synonymous to receiving the Imamat (leadership), similar to how the Ark of Covenant in the house of the Israelites signaled prophethood. Imam Ali al-Ridha narrates that wherever the armaments among us would go, knowledge would also follow and the armaments would never depart from those with knowledge (Imamat).

Other doctrines

Doctrine about necessity of acquiring knowledge
According to Muhammad Rida al-Muzaffar, God gives humans the faculty of reason and argument. Also, God orders humans to spend time thinking carefully on creation while he refers to all creations as his signs of power and glory. These signs encompass all of the universe. Furthermore, there is a similarity between humans as the little world and the universe as the large world. God does not accept the faith of those who follow him without thinking and only with imitation, but also God blames them for such actions. In other words, humans have to think about the universe with reason and intellect, a faculty bestowed on us by God. Since there is more insistence on the faculty of intellect among Shīʿa Muslims, even evaluating the claims of someone who claims prophecy is on the basis of intellect.

Doctrine concerning prayer

Praying in Shīʿa Islam has an important place, as Muhammad described it as a weapon of the believer. In fact, Duʼa considered as something that is a feature of Shia community in a sense. Performing Duʼa in Shīʿa Islam has a special ritual. Because of this, there are many books written on the instructions and conditions of praying among Shīʿa Muslims. Shīʿīte clergymen always invited their followers to recite Duʼa. For instance, ʿAlī has been considered with the subject of Duʼa because of his leadership in monotheism.

Practices

Shīʿa religious practices, such as prayers, differ only slightly from the Sunnīs. While all Muslims pray five times daily, Shīʿa Muslims have the option of combining Dhuhr with Asr and Maghrib with Isha', as there are three distinct times mentioned in the Quran. The Sunnīs tend to combine only under certain circumstances.

Holidays

Shīʿa Muslims celebrate the following annual holidays:
 Eid ul-Fitr, which marks the end of fasting during the month of Ramadan
 Eid al-Adha, which marks the end of the Hajj or pilgrimage to Mecca
 Eid al-Ghadeer, which is the anniversary of the Ghadir Khum, the occasion when Muhammad announced Ali's Imamate before a multitude of Muslims. Eid al-Ghadeer is held on the 18th of Dhu al-Hijjah.
 The Mourning of Muharram and the Day of Ashura for Shīʿa Muslims commemorate the martyrdom of Ḥusayn ibn ʿAlī, brother of Ḥasan and grandson of Muhammad, who was killed by Yazid ibn Muawiyah in Karbala (central Iraq). Ashura is a day of deep mourning which occurs on the 10th of Muharram.
 Arba'een commemorates the suffering of the women and children of Ḥusayn ibn ʿAlī's household. After Ḥusayn was killed, they were marched over the desert, from Karbala (central Iraq) to Shaam (Damascus, Syria). Many children (some of whom were direct descendants of Muhammad) died of thirst and exposure along the route. Arbaein occurs on the 20th of Safar, 40 days after Ashura.
 Mawlid, Muhammad's birth date. Unlike Sunnī Muslims, who celebrate the 12th of Rabi' al-awwal as Muhammad's day of birth or death (because they assert that his birth and death both occur in this week), Shīʿa Muslims celebrate Muhammad's birthday on the 17th of the month, which coincides with the birth date of Jaʿfar al-Ṣādiq, the 6th Shīʿīte Imam.
 Fāṭimah's birthday on 20th of Jumada al-Thani. This day is also considered as the "'women and mothers' day"
 ʿAlī's birthday on 13th of Rajab.
 Mid-Sha'ban is the birth date of the 12th and final Twelver imam, Muhammad al-Mahdi. It is celebrated by Shia Muslims on the 15th of Sha'aban.
 Laylat al-Qadr, anniversary of the night of the revelation of the Quran.
 Eid al-Mubahila celebrates a meeting between the Ahl al-Bayt (household of Muhammad) and a Christian deputation from Najran. Al-Mubahila is held on the 24th of Dhu al-Hijjah.

Holy sites

After the four holy cities of Islam (Mecca, Medina, Jerusalem, and Damascus), the cities of Najaf, Karbala, and Qom are the most revered by Shīʿa Muslims. The Sanctuary of Imām ʿAlī in Najaf, the Shrine of Imam Ḥusayn in Karbala, and the Shrine of Fāṭimah al-Maʿṣūmah in Qom are very essential for Shīʿa Muslims. Other venerated pilgrimage sites include the Imam Reza shrine in Mashhad, the Kadhimiya Mosque in Kadhimiya, Al-Askari Mosque in Samarra, the Sahla Mosque, the Great Mosque of Kufa, the Jamkaran Mosque in Qom, and the Tomb of Daniel in Susa.

Most of the Shīʿa sacred places and heritage sites in Saudi Arabia have been destroyed by the Al Saud-Wahhabi armies of the Ikhwan, the most notable being the tombs of the Imams located in the Al-Baqi' cemetery in 1925. In 2006, a bomb destroyed the shrine of Al-Askari Mosque. (See: Anti-Shi'ism).

Demographics

It is estimated that either 10–20% or 10–13% of the global Muslim population are Shīʿas. They may number up to 200 million as of 2009. As of 1985, Shīʿa Muslims are estimated to be 21% of the Muslim population in South Asia, although the total number is difficult to estimate.

Shīʿa Muslims form a majority of the population in various regions of the Muslim world, including Azerbaijan, Bahrain, Iran, and Iraq, as well as a plurality in Lebanon. Shīʿa Muslims constitute 36.3% of the entire population (and 38.6% of the Muslim population) of the Middle East.

Estimates have placed the proportion of Shīʿa Muslims in Lebanon between 27% and 45% of the population, 30%–35% of the citizen population in Kuwait (no figures exist for the non-citizen population), over 20% in Turkey, 5–20% of the population in Pakistan, and 10–19% of Afghanistan's population.

Saudi Arabia hosts a number of distinct Shīʿa communities, including the Twelver Baharna in the Eastern Province and Nakhawila of Medina, and the Ismāʿīlī Sulaymani and Zaydī Shīʿas of Najran. Estimations put the number of Shīʿīte citizens at 2–4 million, accounting for roughly 15% of the local population. Approximately 40% of the population of Yemen are Shīʿa Muslims.

Significant Shīʿa communities also exist in the coastal regions of West Sumatra and Aceh in Indonesia (see Tabuik). The Shīʿa presence is negligible elsewhere in Southeast Asia, where Muslims are predominantly Shāfiʿī Sunnīs.

A significant Shīʿa minority is present in Nigeria, made up of modern-era converts to a Shīʿīte movement centered around Kano and Sokoto states. Several African countries like Kenya, South Africa, Somalia, etc. hold small minority populations of various Shīʿa subsects, primarily descendants of immigrants from South Asia during the colonial period, such as the Khoja.

Significant populations worldwide
Figures indicated in the first three columns below are based on the October 2009 demographic study by the Pew Research Center report, Mapping the Global Muslim Population.

Major denominations or branches

The Shīʿa community throughout its history split over the issue of the Imamate. The largest branch are the Twelvers, followed by the Zaydīs and the Ismāʿīlīs. Each subsect of Shīʿīsm follows its own line of Imamate. All mainstream Twelver and Ismāʿīlī Shīʿa Muslims follow the same school of thought, the Jaʽfari jurisprudence, named after Jaʿfar al-Ṣādiq, the 6th Shīʿīte Imam. Shīʿīte clergymen and jurists usually carry the title of mujtahid (i.e., someone authorized to issue legal opinions in Shīʿa Islam).

Twelver

Twelver Shīʿīsm or Ithnāʿashariyyah is the largest branch of Shīʿa Islam, and the terms Shīʿa Muslim and Shīʿa often refer to the Twelvers by default. The designation Twelver is derived from the doctrine of believing in twelve divinely ordained leaders, known as "the Twelve Imams". Twelver Shīʿas are otherwise known as Imami or Jaʿfari; the latter term derives from Jaʿfar al-Ṣādiq, the 6th Shīʿīte Imam, who elaborated the Twelver jurisprudence. Twelver Shīʿas constitute the majority of the population in Iran (90%), Azerbaijan (85%), Bahrain (70%), Iraq (65%), and Lebanon (65% of Muslims).

Doctrine
Twelver doctrine is based on five principles. These five principles known as Usul ad-Din are as follow:
 Monotheism: God is one and unique;
 Justice: the concept of moral rightness based on ethics, fairness, and equity, along with the punishment of the breach of these ethics;
 Prophethood: the institution by which God sends emissaries, or prophets, to guide humankind;
 Leadership: a divine institution which succeeded the institution of Prophethood. Its appointees (Imams) are divinely appointed;
 Resurrection and Last Judgment: God's final assessment of humanity.

More specifically, these principles are known as Usul al-Madhhab (principles of the Shīʿa branch of Islam) according to Twelver Shīʿas, which differ from Daruriyat al-Din ("Necessities of Religion"), which are principles in order for one to be a Muslim. Daruriyat al-Din don't include leadership (Imamah), as it is not a requirement in order for one to be recognized as a Muslim. However, this category, according to Twelver scholars like Ayatollah Abu al-Qasim al-Khoei, does include belief in God, prophethood, the Day of Resurrection, and other "necessities" (such as the belief in angels). In this regard, Twelver Shīʿas draw a distinction in terms of believing in the main principles of Islam on the one hand, and specifically Shīʿīte doctrines like the Imamate on the other.

Books
Besides the Quran, which is the sacred text common to all Muslims, Twelver Shīʿas derive scriptural and authoritative guidance from collections of sayings and traditions (ḥadīth) attributed to Muhammad and the Twelve Imams. Below is a list of some of the most prominent of these books:
 Nahj al-Balagha by Ash-Sharif Ar-Radhi – the most famous collection of sermons, letters & narration attributed to Ali, the first Imam regarded by Shias
 Kitab al-Kafi by Muhammad ibn Ya'qub al-Kulayni
 Wasa'il al-Shiʻah by al-Hurr al-Amili

The Twelve Imams

The Twelve Imams are the spiritual and political successors to Muhammad for the Twelvers. According to the theology of Twelvers, the successor of Muhammad is an infallible human individual who not only rules over the Muslim community with justice but also is able to keep and interpret the divine law (sharīʿa) and its esoteric meaning. The words and deeds of Muhammad and the Twelve Imams are a guide and model for the Muslim community to follow; as a result, they must be free from error and sin, and Imams must be chosen by divine decree (nass) through Muhammad. In Twelver Shīʿīsm, each Imam was the son of the previous Imam, with the exception of Ḥusayn ibn ʿAlī, who was the brother of Ḥasan ibn ʿAlī. The twelfth and final Imam is Hujjat Allah al-Mahdi, who is believed by Twelvers to be currently alive and hidden in Occultation.

Jurisprudence

The Twelver jurisprudence is called Jaʽfari jurisprudence. In this school of Islamic jurisprudence, the sunnah is considered to be comprehensive of the oral traditions of Muhammad and their implementation and interpretation by the Twelve Imams. There are three schools of Jaʿfari jurisprudence: Usuli, Akhbari, and Shaykhi; the Usuli school is by far the largest of the three. Twelver groups that don't follow the Jaʿfari jurisprudence include Alevis, Bektashi, and Qizilbash.

The five pillars of Islam to the Jaʿfari jurisprudence are known as Usul ad-Din:
 Tawḥīd: unity and oneness of God;
 Nubuwwah: prophethood of Muhammad;
 Muʿad: resurrection and final judgment;
 ʿAdl: justice of God;
 Imamah: the rightful place of the Shīʿīte Imams.

In Jaʿfari jurisprudence, there are eight secondary pillars, known as Furu ad-Din, which are as follows:
 Salat (prayer);
 Sawm (fasting);
 Hajj (pilgrimage) to Mecca;
 Zakāt (alms giving to the poor);
 Jihād (struggle) for the righteous cause;
 Directing others towards good;
 Directing others away from evil;
 Khums (20% tax on savings yearly, after deduction of commercial expenses).

According to Twelvers, defining and interpretation of Islamic jurisprudence (fiqh) is the responsibility of Muhammad and the Twelve Imams. Since the 12th Imam is currently in Occultation, it is the duty of Shīʿīte clerics to refer to the Islamic literature, such as the Quran and ḥadīth, and identify legal decisions within the confines of Islamic law to provide means to deal with current issues from an Islamic perspective. In other words, clergymen in Twelver Shīʿīsm are believed to be the guardians of fiqh, which is believed to have been defined by Muhammad and his twelve successors. This process is known as ijtihad and the clerics are known as marjaʿ, meaning "reference"; the labels Allamah and Ayatollah are in use for Twelver clerics.

Islamists
Islamist Shīʿīsm is a new denomination within Twelver Shīʿīsm greatly inspired by the political ideology of the Muslim Brotherhood and mysticism of Ibn Arabi. It sees Islam as a political system and differs from the other mainstream Usuli and Akhbari groups in favoring the idea of the establishment of an Islamic state in Occultation under the rule of the 12th Imam. Hadi Khosroshahi was the first person to identify himself as ikhwani (Islamist) Shīʿa Muslim. Because of the concept of the hidden Imam, Muhammad al-Mahdi, Shīʿa Islam is inherently secular in the age of Occultation, therefore Islamist Shīʿa Muslims had to borrow ideas from Sunnī Islamists and adjust them in accordance with the doctrine of Shīʿīsm. Its foundations were laid during the Persian Constitutional Revolution at the start of 20th century in Qajar Iran (1905–1911), when Fazlullah Nouri supported the Persian king Ahmad Shah Qajar against the will of Muhammad Kazim Khurasani, the Usuli marjaʿ of the time.

Ismāʿīlī (Sevener)

Ismāʿīlīs, otherwise known as Sevener, derive their name from their acceptance of Ismāʿīl ibn Jaʿfar as the divinely appointed spiritual successor (Imam) to Jaʿfar al-Ṣādiq, the 6th Shīʿīte Imam, wherein they differ from the Twelvers, who recognize Mūsā al-Kāẓim, younger brother of Ismāʿīl, as the true Imam.

After the death or Occultation of Muhammad ibn Imam Ismāʿīl in the 8th century CE, the teachings of Ismāʿīlīsm further transformed into the belief system as it is known today, with an explicit concentration on the deeper, esoteric meaning (bāṭin) of the Islamic faith. With the eventual development of Twelver Shīʿīsm into the more literalistic (zahīr) oriented Akhbari and later Usuli schools of thought, Shīʿīsm further developed in two separate directions: the metaphorical Ismāʿīlī group focusing on the mystical path and nature of God and the divine manifestation in the personage of the "Imam of the Time" as the "Face of God", with the more literalistic Twelver group focusing on divine law (sharī'ah) and the deeds and sayings (sunnah) attributed to Muhammad and his successors (the Ahl al-Bayt), who as A'immah were guides and a light (nūr) to God.

Though there are several subsects amongst the Ismāʿīlīs, the term in today's vernacular generally refers to the Shīʿa Imami Ismāʿīlī Nizārī community, often referred to as the Ismāʿīlīs by default, who are followers of the Aga Khan and the largest group within Ismāʿīlīsm. Another Shīʿa Imami Ismāʿīlī community are the Dawudi Bohras, led by a Da'i al-Mutlaq ("Unrestricted Missionary") as representative of a hidden Imam. While there are many other branches with extremely differing exterior practices, much of the spiritual theology has remained the same since the days of the faith's early Imams. In recent centuries, Ismāʿīlīs have largely been an Indo-Iranian community, but they can also be found in India, Pakistan, Syria, Palestine, Saudi Arabia, Yemen, Jordan, Uzbekistan, Tajikistan, Afghanistan, East and South Africa, and in recent years several Ismāʿīlīs have emigrated to China, Western Europe (primarily in the United Kingdom), Australia, New Zealand, and North America.

Ismāʿīlī Imams

In the Nizārī Ismāʿīlī interpretation of Shīʿa Islam, the Imam is the guide and the intercessor between humans and God, and the individual through whom God is recognized. He is also responsible for the esoteric interpretation of the Quran (taʾwīl). He is the possessor of divine knowledge and therefore the "Prime Teacher". According to the "Epistle of the Right Path", a Persian Ismāʿīlī prose text from the post-Mongol period of Ismāʿīlī history, by an anonymous author, there has been a chain of Imams since the beginning of time, and there will continue to be an Imam present on the Earth until the end of time. The worlds would not exist in perfection without this uninterrupted chain of Imams. The proof (hujja) and gate (bāb) of the Imam are always aware of his presence and are witness to this uninterrupted chain.

After the death of Ismāʿīl ibn Jaʿfar, many Ismāʿīlīs believed that one day the eschatological figure of Imam Mahdi, whom they believed to be Muhammad ibn Imam Ismāʿīl, would return and establish an age of justice. One group included the violent Qarmatians, who had a stronghold in Bahrain. In contrast, some Ismāʿīlīs believed the Imamate did continue, and that the Imams were in Occultation and still communicated and taught their followers through a network of Da'i ("Missionaries").

In 909 CE, Abdullah al-Mahdi Billah, a claimant to the Ismāʿīlī Imamate, established the Fatimid Caliphate. During this period, three lineages of Imams were formed. The first branch, known today as the Druze, began with Al-Ḥākim bi-Amr Allāh. Born in 985 CE, he ascended as ruler at the age of eleven. When in 1021 CE his mule returned without him, soaked in blood, a religious group that was forming in his lifetime broke off from mainstream Ismāʿīlīsm and didn't acknowledge his successor. Later to be known as the Druze, they believe Al-Ḥākim to be God incarnate and the prophesied Mahdi on Earth, who would one day return and bring justice to the world. The Druze faith further split from Ismāʿīlīsm as it developed into a distinct monotheistic Abrahamic religion and ethno-religious group with its own unique doctrines, and finally separated from both Ismāʿīlīsm and Islam altogether. Thus, the Druze don't identify themselves as Muslims, and aren't considered as such by Muslims either.

The second split occurred between Nizārī and Musta‘lī Ismāʿīlīs following the death of Ma'ad al-Mustansir Billah in 1094 CE. His rule was the longest of any caliph in any Islamic empire. Upon his passing away, his sons, Nizār (the older) and Al-Musta‘lī (the younger), fought for political and spiritual control of the dynasty. Nizār was defeated and jailed, but according to the Nizārī tradition his son escaped to Alamut, where the Iranian Ismāʿīlī had accepted his claim. From here on, the Nizārī Ismāʿīlī community has continued with a present, living Imam.

The Musta‘lī Ismāʿīlīs split between the Ṭayyibi and the Ḥāfiẓi; Ṭayyibi Ismāʿīlīs, also known as "Bohras", are further divided between Dawudi Bohras, Sulaymani Bohras, and Alavi Bohras. The former denomination claims that At-Tayyib Abi l-Qasim, son of Al-Amir bi-Ahkami l-Lah, and the Imams following him went into a period of anonymity (Dawr-e-Satr) and appointed a Da'i al-Mutlaq ("Unrestricted Missionary") to guide the community, in a similar manner as the Ismāʿīlīs had lived after the death of Muhammad ibn Imam Ismāʿīl. The latter denomination claims that the ruling Fatimid caliph was the Imam, and they died out with the fall of the Fatimid Empire.

Pillars
Ismāʿīlīs have categorized their practices which are known as seven pillars:

Contemporary leadership
The Nizārīs place importance on a scholarly institution because of the existence of a present Imam. The Imam of the Age defines the jurisprudence, and his guidance may differ with Imams previous to him because of different times and circumstances. For Nizārī Ismāʿīlīs, the current Imam is Karim al-Husayni Aga Khan IV. The Nizārī line of Imams has continued to this day as an uninterrupted chain.

Divine leadership has continued in the Bohra branch through the institution of the "Missionary" (Da'i). According to the Bohra tradition, before the last Imam, At-Tayyib Abi l-Qasim, went into seclusion, his father, the 20th Al-Amir bi-Ahkami l-Lah, had instructed Al-Hurra Al-Malika the Malika (Queen consort) in Yemen to appoint a vicegerent after the seclusion—the Da'i al-Mutlaq ("Unrestricted Missionary"), who as the Imam's vicegerent has full authority to govern the community in all matters both spiritual and temporal while the lineage of Musta‘lī-Ṭayyibi Imams remains in seclusion (Dawr-e-Satr). The three branches of Musta‘lī Ismāʿīlīs (Dawudi Bohras, Sulaymani Bohras, and Alavi Bohras) differ on who the current "Unrestricted Missionary" is.

Zaydī (Fiver)

Zaydism, otherwise known as Zaydiyya or as Zaydī Shīʿism, is a branch of Shīʿa Islam named after Zayd ibn ʿAlī. Followers of the Zaydī school of jurisprudence are called Zaydīs or occasionally Fivers. However, there is also a group called Zaydī Wāsiṭīs who are Twelvers (see below). Zaydīs constitute roughly 42–47% of the population of Yemen.

Doctrine
The Zaydīs, Twelvers, and Ismāʿīlīs all recognize the same first four Imams; however, the Zaydīs consider Zayd ibn ʿAlī as the 5th Imam. After the time of Zayd ibn ʿAlī, the Zaydīs believed that any descendant (Sayyid) of Ḥasan ibn ʿAlī or Ḥusayn ibn ʿAlī could become the next Imam, after fulfilling certain conditions. Other well-known Zaydī Imams in history were Yahya ibn Zayd, Muhammad al-Nafs al-Zakiyya, and Ibrahim ibn Abdullah.

The Zaydī doctrine of Imamah doesn't presuppose the infallibility of the Imam, nor the belief that the Imams are supposed to receive divine guidance. Moreover, Zaydīs don't believe that the Imamate must pass from father to son but believe it can be held by any Sayyid descended from either Ḥasan ibn ʿAlī or Ḥusayn ibn ʿAlī (as was the case after the death of the former). Historically, Zaydīs held that Zayd ibn ʿAlī was the rightful successor of the 4th Imam since he led a rebellion against the Umayyads in protest of their tyranny and corruption. Muhammad al-Baqir did not engage in political action, and the followers of Zayd ibn ʿAlī maintained that a true Imam must fight against corrupt rulers.

Jurisprudence
In matters of Islamic jurisprudence, Zaydīs follow the teachings of Zayd ibn ʿAlī, which are documented in his book Majmu'l Fiqh. Al-Ḥādī ila'l-Ḥaqq Yaḥyā, the first Zaydī Imam and founder of the Zaydī State in Yemen, is regarded as the codifier of Zaydī jurisprudence, and as such most Zaydī Shīʿas today are known as Hadawis.

Timeline
The Idrisids were Arab Zaydī Shīʿas whose dynasty, named after its first sultan, Idris I, ruled in the western Maghreb from 788 to 985 CE. Another Zaydī State was established in the region of Gilan, Deylaman, and Tabaristan (northern Iran) in 864 CE by the Alavids; it lasted until the death of its leader at the hand of the Samanids in 928 CE. Roughly forty years later, the Zaydī State was revived in Gilan and survived under Hasanid leaders until 1126 CE. Afterwards, from the 12th to 13th centuries, the Zaydī Shīʿas of Deylaman, Gilan, and Tabaristan then acknowledged the Zaydī Imams of Yemen or rival Zaydī Imams within Iran.

The Buyids were initially Zaydī Shīʿas, as were the Banu Ukhaidhir rulers of al-Yamama in the 9th and 10th centuries. The leader of the Zaydī community took the title of caliph; thus, the ruler of Yemen was known by this title. Al-Hadi Yahya bin al-Hussain bin al-Qasim ar-Rassi, a descendant of Ḥasan ibn ʿAlī, founded the Zaydī Imamate at Sa'dah in 893–897 CE, and the Rassid dynasty continued to rule over Yemen until the middle of the 20th century, when the republican revolution of 1962 deposed the last Zaydī Imam. (See: Arab Cold War). The founding Zaydī branch in Yemen was the Jarudiyya; however, with increasing interaction with the Ḥanafī and Shāfiʿī schools of Sunnī jurisprudence, there was a shift from the Jarudiyya group to the Sulaimaniyya, Tabiriyya, Butriyya, and Salihiyya. Zaydī Shīʿas form the second dominant religious group in Yemen. Currently, they constitute about 40–45% of the population in Yemen; Jaʿfaris and Ismāʿīlīs constitute the 2–5%. In Saudi Arabia, it is estimated that there are over 1 million Zaydī Shīʿas, primarily based in the western provinces.

Currently, the most prominent Zaydī political movement is the Houthi movement in Yemen, known by the name of Shabab al-Mu'mineen ("Believing Youth") or Ansar Allah ("Partisans of God"). In 2014–2015, Houthis took over the Yemeni government in Sana'a, which led to the fall of the Saudi Arabian-backed government of Abd Rabbuh Mansur Hadi. Houthis and their allies gained control of a significant part of Yemen's territory, and resisted the Saudi Arabian-led intervention in Yemen seeking to restore Hadi in power. (See: Iran–Saudi Arabia proxy conflict). Both the Houthis and the Saudi Arabian-led coalition were being attacked by the Sunnī Islamist militant group and Salafi-jihadist terrorist organization ISIL/ISIS/IS/Daesh.

History

Succession of ʿAlī

Shīʿa Muslims believe that just as a prophet is appointed by God alone, only God has the prerogative to appoint the successor to his prophet. They believe God chose ʿAlī ibn Abī Ṭālib to be Muhammad's successor, infallible, the first caliph (khalīfa, head of state) of Islam. Shīʿa Muslims believe that Muhammad designated Ali as his successor by God's command (Eid Al Ghadir). ʿAlī was Muhammad's first-cousin and closest living male relative as well as his son-in-law, having married Muhammad's daughter, Fāṭimah.

The Party of ʿAlī

Even during the time of Muhammad, there were signs of split among the companions with Salman al-Farsi, Abu Dharr al-Ghifari, Miqdad, and Ammar ibn Yasir amongst the most vehement and loyal supporters of ʿAlī.

The event of Dhul Asheera

During the revelation of Ash-Shu'ara, the twenty-sixth Surah of the Quran, in  617 CE, Muhammad is said to have received instructions to warn his family members against adhering to their pre-Islamic religious practices. There are differing accounts of Muhammad's attempt to do this, with one version stating that he had invited his relatives to a meal (later termed the Feast of Dhul Asheera), during which he gave the pronouncement. According to Ibn Ishaq, it consisted of the following speech:

Among those gathered, only ʿAlī offered his consent. Some sources, such as the Musnad Ahmad ibn Hanbal, do not record Muhammad's reaction to this, though Ibn Ishaq continues that he then declared ʿAlī to be his brother, heir and successor. In another narration, when Muhammad accepted ʿAlī's offer, he "threw up his arms around the generous youth, and pressed him to his bosom" and said, "Behold my brother, my vizir, my vicegerent ... let all listen to his words, and obey him." The direct appointment of ʿAlī as heir in this version is notable in that it alleges that his right to succession was established at the very beginning of Muhammad's prophetic activity. The association with the revelation of a Quranic verse also serves the purpose of providing the nomination with authenticity as well as a divine authorization.

Event of Ghadir Khumm

The ḥadīth report of Ghadir Khumm has many different variations and is transmitted by both Sunnī and Shīʿa sources. The narrations generally state that in March 632, Muhammad, while returning from his Farewell Pilgrimage alongside a large number of followers and companions, stopped at the oasis of Ghadir Khumm. There, he took ʿAlī's hand and addressed the gathering. The point of contention between different sects arises when Muhammad, whilst giving his speech, gave the proclamation "Anyone who has me as his mawla, has ʿAlī as his mawla." Some versions add the additional sentence "O God, befriend the friend of ʿAlī and be the enemy of his enemy."

Mawla has a number of meanings in Arabic, with interpretations of Muhammad's use here being split along sectarian lines between the Sunnī and Shīʿa Muslims. Among the former group, the word is translated as "friend" or "one who is loyal/close" and that Muhammad was advocating that ʿAlī was deserving of friendship and respect. Conversely, Shīʿa Muslims tend to view the meaning as being "master" or "ruler", and that the statement was a clear designation of ʿAlī being Muhammad's appointed successor. Shīʿa sources also record further details of the event, such as stating that those present congratulated ʿAlī and acclaimed him as Amir al-Mu'minin ("commander of the believers").

Caliphate of ʿAlī

When Muhammad died in 632 CE, ʿAlī ibn Abī Ṭālib and Muhammad's closest relatives made the funeral arrangements. While they were preparing his body, Abū Bakr, ʿUmar ibn al-Khaṭṭāb, and Abu Ubaidah ibn al Jarrah met with the leaders of Medina and elected Abū Bakr as caliph. ʿAlī did not accept the caliphate of Abū Bakr and refused to pledge allegiance to him. This is indicated in a ḥadīth report which both Sunnī and Shīʿa Muslims regard as sahih (authentic).

Ibn Qutaybah, a 9th-century Sunnī Islamic scholar narrates of ʿAlī:I am the servant of God and the brother of the Messenger of God. I am thus more worthy of this office than you. I shall not give allegiance to you [Abu Bakr & Umar] when it is more proper for you to give bayʼah to me. You have seized this office from the Ansar using your tribal relationship to the Prophet as an argument against them. Would you then seize this office from us, the ahl al-bayt by force? Did you not claim before the Ansar that you were more worthy than they of the caliphate because Muhammad came from among you (but Muhammad was never from Abu Bakr's family) – and thus they gave you leadership and surrendered command? I now contend against you with the same argument…It is we who are more worthy of the Messenger of God, living or dead. Give us our due right if you truly have faith in God, or else bear the charge of wilfully doing wrong... Umar, I will not yield to your commands: I shall not pledge loyalty to him.' Ultimately Abu Bakr said, "O 'Ali! If you do not desire to give your bay'ah, I am not going to force you for the same.

ʿAlī's wife and daughter of Muhammad, Fāṭimah, refused to pledge allegiance to Abū Bakr and remained angry with him until she died due to the issues of Fadak, the inheritance from her father, and the situation of ʿUmar at Fāṭimah's house; this is stated in various Sunnī ḥadīth collections, including Sahih al-Bukhari and Sahih Muslim. Fāṭimah never pledged allegiance to Abū Bakr; neither did she acknowledge or accept his claim to the caliphate. Almost all members of Banu Hashim, the Quraysh tribe to which Muhammad belonged, and many of his closest companions (the ṣaḥāba) had supported ʿAlī's cause after the death of Muhammad, whilst others supported Abū Bakr.

It was not until the murder of the third rāshidūn caliph, ʿUthmān (657 CE), that the Muslims of Medina in desperation invited ʿAlī to become the fourth caliph as the last source, and he established his capital in Kufa (present-day Iraq). ʿAlī's rule over the early Muslim community was often contested, and wars were waged against him. As a result, he had to struggle to maintain his power against the groups who betrayed him after giving allegiance to his succession, or those who wished to take his position. This dispute eventually led to the First Fitna, which was the first major civil war between Muslims within the early Islamic empire. The First Fitna began as a series of revolts fought against ʿAlī, caused by the assassination of his political predecessor, ʿUthmān. While the rebels had previously affirmed the legitimacy of ʿAlī's khilafāʾ (caliphate), they later turned against ʿAlī and fought him. ʿAlī ruled from 656 CE to 661 CE, when he was assassinated while prostrating in prayer (sujud). ʿAlī's main rival, Muawiyah, then claimed the caliphate.

The connection between the Indus Valley and Shīʿa Islam was established through the early Muslim conquests. According to Derryl N. Maclean, a link between the Sindh region and Shīʿas or proto-Shīʿas can be traced to Hakim ibn Jabalah al-Abdi, a companion of Muhammad, who traveled across the Sindh to Makran in the year 649 CE, and presented a report on the area to the caliph. He supported ʿAlī, and died in the Battle of the Camel alongside Sindhi Jats. He was also a poet and few couplets of his poem in praise of ʿAlī have survived, as reported in Chachnama:

During the caliphate of ʿAlī, many Jats came under the influence of Shīʿa Islam. Harith ibn Murrah Al-abdi and Sayfi ibn Fil' al-Shaybani, both officers of ʿAlī's army, attacked Sindhi bandits and chased them to Al-Qiqan (present-day Quetta) in the year 658 CE. Sayfi was one of the seven Shīʿa Muslims who were beheaded alongside Hujr ibn Adi al-Kindi in 660 CE, near Damascus.

Ḥasan ibn ʿAlī

Upon the death of ʿAlī, his elder son Ḥasan became leader of the Muslims of Kufa, and after a series of skirmishes between the Kufa Muslims and the army of Muawiyah, Ḥasan agreed to cede the caliphate to Muawiyah and maintain peace among Muslims upon certain conditions:
 The enforced public cursing of ʿAlī, e.g. during prayers, should be abandoned
 Muawiyah should not use tax money for his own private needs
 There should be peace, and followers of Ḥasan should be given security and their rights
 Muawiyah will never adopt the title of Amir al-Mu'minin ("commander of the believers")
 Muawiyah will not nominate any successor
Ḥasan then retired to Medina, where in 670 CE he was poisoned by his wife Ja'da bint al-Ash'ath ibn Qays, after being secretly contacted by Muawiyah who wished to pass the caliphate to his own son Yazid and saw Ḥasan as an obstacle.

Ḥusayn ibn ʿAlī

Ḥusayn ibn ʿAlī, ʿAlī's younger son and brother to Ḥasan, initially resisted calls to lead the Muslims against Muawiyah and reclaim the caliphate. In 680 CE, Muawiyah died and passed the caliphate to his son Yazid, and breaking the treaty with Ḥasan ibn ʿAlī. Yazid asked Husayn to swear allegiance (bay'ah) to him. ʿAlī's faction, having expected the caliphate to return to ʿAlī's line upon Muawiyah's death, saw this as a betrayal of the peace treaty and so Ḥusayn rejected this request for allegiance. There was a groundswell of support in Kufa for Ḥusayn to return there and take his position as caliph and Imam, so Ḥusayn collected his family and followers in Medina and set off for Kufa. En route to Kufa, he was blocked by an army of Yazid's men, which included people from Kufa, near Karbala (modern Iraq); Ḥusayn and approximately 72 of his family members and followers were killed in the Battle of Karbala.

Shīʿa Muslims regard Ḥusayn ibn ʿAlī as a martyr (shahid), and count him as an Imam from the Ahl al-Bayt. They view Ḥusayn ibn ʿAlī as the defender of Islam from annihilation at the hands of Yazid I. Ḥusayn is the last Imam following ʿAlī mutually recognized by all branches of Shīʿa Islam. The Battle of Karbala and martyrdom of Ḥusayn ibn ʿAlī is often cited as the definitive separation between the Shīʿa and Sunnī sects of Islam, and is commemorated each year by Shīʿa Muslims on the Day of Ashura.

Imamate of the Ahl al-Bayt

Later, most denominations of Shīʿa Islam, including Twelvers and Ismāʿīlīs, became Imamis. Imami Shīʿītes believe that Imams are the spiritual and political successors to Muhammad. Imams are human individuals who not only rule over the Muslim community with justice, but also are able to keep and interpret the divine law and its esoteric meaning. The words and deeds of Muhammad and the Imams are a guide and model for the community to follow; as a result, they must be free from error and sin, and must be chosen by divine decree (nass) through Muhammad. According to this view peculiar to Shīʿa Islam, there is always an Imam of the Age, who is the divinely appointed authority on all matters of faith and law in the Muslim community. ʿAlī was the first Imam of this line, the rightful successor to Muhammad, followed by male descendants of Muhammad through his daughter Fatimah.

This difference between following either the Ahl al-Bayt (Muhammad's family and descendants) or pledging allegiance to Abū Bakr has shaped the Shīʿa—Sunnī divide on the interpretation of some Quranic verses, ḥadīth literature (accounts of the sayings and living habits attributed to the Islamic prophet Muhammad during his lifetime), and other areas of Islamic belief throughout the history of Islam. For instance, the ḥadīth collections venerated by Shīʿa Muslims are centered on narrations by members of the Ahl al-Bayt and their supporters, while some ḥadīth transmitted by narrators not belonging to or supporting the Ahl al-Bayt are not included. Those of Abu Hurairah, for example, Ibn Asakir in his Taʿrikh Kabir, and Muttaqi in his Kanzuʿl-Umma report that ʿUmar ibn al-Khaṭṭāb lashed him, rebuked him, and forbade him to narrate ḥadīth from Muhammad. ʿUmar is reported to have said: "Because you narrate hadith in large numbers from the Holy Prophet, you are fit only for attributing lies to him. (That is, one expects a wicked man like you to utter only lies about the Holy Prophet.) So you must stop narrating hadith from the Prophet; otherwise, I will send you to the land of Dus." (An Arab clan in Yemen, to which Abu Hurairah belonged). According to Sunnī Muslims, ʿAlī was the fourth successor to Abū Bakr, while Shīʿa Muslims maintain that ʿAlī was the first divinely sanctioned "Imam", or successor of Muhammad. The seminal event in Shīʿa history is the martyrdom at the Battle of Karbala of ʿAlī's son, Ḥusayn ibn ʿAlī, and 71 of his followers in 680 CE, who led a non-allegiance movement against the defiant caliph.

It is believed in Twelver and Ismāʿīlī branches of Shīʿa Islam that divine wisdom (ʿaql) was the source of the souls of the prophets and Imams, which bestowed upon them esoteric knowledge (ḥikmah), and that their sufferings were a means of divine grace to their devotees. Although the Imam was not the recipient of a divine revelation (waḥy), he had a close relationship with God, through which God guides him, and the Imam, in turn, guides the people. Imamate, or belief in the divine guide, is a fundamental belief in the Twelver and Ismāʿīlī branches of Shīʿa Islam, and is based on the concept that God would not leave humanity without access to divine guidance.

Imam Mahdi, last Imam of the Shīʿa

In Shīʿa Islam, Imam Mahdi is regarded as the prophesied eschatological redeemer of Islam who will rule for seven, nine, or nineteen years (according to differing interpretations) before the Day of Judgment and will rid the world of evil. According to Islamic tradition, the Mahdi's tenure will coincide with the Second Coming of Jesus (ʿĪsā), who is to assist the Mahdi against the Masih ad-Dajjal (literally, the "false Messiah" or Antichrist). Jesus, who is considered the Masih ("Messiah") in Islam, will descend at the point of a white arcade east of Damascus, dressed in yellow robes with his head anointed. He will then join the Mahdi in his war against the Dajjal, where it is believed the Mahdi will slay the Dajjal and unite humankind.

Historians dispute over the origins of Shīʿa Islam, with many Western scholars positing that Shīʿīsm began as a political faction rather than a truly religious movement. Other scholars disagree, considering this concept of religious-political separation to be an anachronistic application of a Western concept.

Dynasties

In the century following the Battle of Karbala (680 CE), as various Shia-affiliated groups diffused in the emerging Islamic world, several nations arose based on a Shia leadership or population.
Idrisids (788–985 CE): a Zaydi dynasty in what is now Morocco
Qarmatians (899–1077 CE): an Ismaili Iranian dynasty. Their headquarters were in East Arabia and Bahrain. It was founded by Abu Sa'id al-Jannabi.
Buyids (934–1055 CE): a Twelver Iranian dynasty. at its peak consisted of large portions of modern Iraq and Iran.
Uqaylids (990–1096 CE): a Shia Arab dynasty with several lines that ruled in various parts of Al-Jazira, northern Syria and Iraq.
 Ilkhanate (1256–1335): a Persianate Mongol khanate established in Persia in the 13th century, considered a part of the Mongol Empire. The Ilkhanate was based, originally, on Genghis Khan's campaigns in the Khwarezmid Empire in 1219–1224, and founded by Genghis's grandson, Hulagu, in territories which today comprise most of Iran, Iraq, Afghanistan, Turkmenistan, Armenia, Azerbaijan, Georgia, Turkey, and Pakistan. The Ilkhanate initially embraced many religions, but was particularly sympathetic to Buddhism and Christianity. Later Ilkhanate rulers, beginning with Ghazan in 1295, embraced Islam his brother Öljaitü promoted Shia Islam.
 Bahmanids (1347–1527): a Shia Muslim state of the Deccan in southern India and one of the great medieval Indian kingdoms. Bahmanid Sultanate was the first independent Islamic Kingdom in South India.

Fatimid Caliphate

 Fatimids (909–1171 CE): Controlled much of North Africa, the Levant, parts of Arabia and Mecca and Medina. The group takes its name from Fatima, Muhammad's daughter, from whom they claim descent.
 In 909 CE the Shi'i military leader Abu Abdallah al-Shiʻi, overthrew the Sunni ruler in Northern Africa; which began the Fatimid regime.
 Jawhar (general) (966–d. 992) was a Fatimid general. Under the command of Caliph Al-Mu'izz, he led the conquest of North Africa and then of Egypt, founded the city of Cairo and the great al-Azhar Mosque. A Greek slave by origin, he was freed by Al-Mu'izz.

Safavid Empire

A major turning point in the history of Shīʿa Islam was the dominion of the Safavid dynasty (1501–1736) in Persia. This caused a number of changes in the Muslim world:
 The ending of the relative mutual tolerance between Sunnīs and Shīʿas that existed from the time of the Mongol conquests onwards and the resurgence of antagonism between the two groups.
 Initial dependence of Shīʿīte clerics on the state followed by the emergence of an independent body of ulama capable of taking a political stand different from official policies.
 The growth in importance of Persian centers of Islamic education and religious learning, which resulted in the change of Twelver Shīʿīsm from being a predominantly Arab phenomenon to become predominantly Persian.
 The growth of the Akhbari school of thought, which taught that only the Quran, ḥadīth literature, and sunnah (accounts of the sayings and living habits attributed to the Islamic prophet Muhammad during his lifetime) are to be bases for verdicts, rejecting the use of reasoning.

With the fall of the Safavids, the state in Persia—including the state system of courts with government-appointed judges (qāḍī)—became much weaker. This gave the sharīʿa courts of mujtahid an opportunity to fill the legal vacuum and enabled the ulama to assert their judicial authority. The Usuli school of thought also increased in strength at this time.

Persecution of Shīʿa Muslims

The history of Shīʿa—Sunnī relations has often involved religious discrimination, persecution, and violence, dating back to the earliest development of the two competing sects.
At various times throughout the history of Islam, Shīʿa groups and minorities have faced persecution perpetrated by Sunnī Muslims.

Militarily established and holding control over the Umayyad government, many Sunnī rulers perceived the Shīʿas as a threat—both to their political and religious authority. The Sunnī rulers under the Umayyad dynasty sought to marginalize the Shīʿa minority, and later the Abbasids turned on their Shīʿa allies and imprisoned, persecuted, and killed them. The persecution of Shīʿa Muslims throughout history by their Sunnī co-religionists has often been characterized by brutal and genocidal acts. Comprising only about 10–15% of the global Muslim population, Shīʿa Muslims remain a marginalized community to this day in many Sunnī-dominant Arab countries, without the rights to practice their religion and freely organize.

In 1514, the Ottoman sultan Selim I (1512–1520) ordered the massacre of 40,000 Alevis and Bektashi (Anatolian Shīʿa Muslims). According to Jalal Al-e-Ahmad, "Sultan Selim I carried things so far that he announced that the killing of one Shīʿa had as much otherworldly reward as killing 70 Christians." In 1802, the Al Saud-Wahhabi armies of the Ikhwan from the First Saudi State (1727–1818) attacked and sacked the city of Karbala, the Shīʿa shrine in Najaf (eastern region of Iraq) that commemorates the martyrdom and death of Ḥusayn ibn ʿAlī.

Under Saddam Hussein's Ba'athist regime in Iraq (1968–2003), Shīʿa Muslims were heavily persecuted, arrested, tortured, and killed. In March 2011, the Malaysian government declared Shīʿa Islam a "deviant" sect and banned Shīʿa Muslims from promoting their faith to other Muslims, but left them free to practice it themselves privately.

The most recent and grave attempt by Sunnī Muslims to entirely eradicate the Shīʿa community through violent means was the large-scale genocide of Shīʿa Muslims organized and perpetrated by ISIL/ISIS/IS/Daesh in Syria and Iraq between 2014 and 2018, which occurred alongside the genocides of many other religious minorities in the same region of the Middle East perpetrated by the aforementioned Sunnī Islamist militant group and Salafi-jihadist terrorist organization.

See also

 Alawi Islam
 Anti-Shi'ism
 Criticism of Twelver Shia Islam
 History of Shia Islam
 Imamate in Shia doctrine
 Imamate and guardianship of Ali ibn Abi Talib
 Imamate in Ismaili doctrine
 Imamate in Nizari doctrine
 Imamate in Twelver doctrine
 Intellectual proofs in Shia jurisprudence
 List of Shia books
 List of Shia Islamic dynasties
 List of Shia Muslim scholars of Islam
 List of Shia Muslims
 Shia clergy
 Shia crescent
 Shia genocide
 Shia Islam in the Indian subcontinent
 Shia nations
 Shia Rights Watch
 Shia view of Ali
 Shia view of the Quran

References

Notes

Citations

Sources

Further reading

 
 

 
 
 
 
 
 
 
 
 
 
 
 Shi'a Minorities in the Contemporary World: Migration, Transnationalism and Multilocality. United Kingdom, Edinburgh University Press, 2020.

External links